The following is a list of members of the New Zealand Labour Party who have served in the New Zealand House of Representatives. The New Zealand Labour Party was founded in 1916. Most members had been a part of the United Labour Party or Social Democratic Party.

Several MPs were associated with precursors to the New Zealand Labour Party but did not join it in 1916; John Payne and Bill Veitch. Both supported conscription in World War I unlike their colleagues. Veitch was part of the United Labour Party "Remnant"  with Alfred Hindmarsh and Andrew Walker (See pre-1916 MPs). Two MPs were subsequently elected as Independent Labour candidates; Sydney Smith in 1918 & Edward Kellett in 1919, but never joined the party.

Notes
†:Died in office

Sources
Appendices to the Journals of the House of Representatives, H33 and/or E9, various years. E9's since 1994 are available here.

Labour MPs